Abu Nasr Mansur ibn Moshkan, better simply known as Abu Nasr Moshkan, was a Persian statesman who served as the head of the Ghaznavid chancery from 1011/2 till his death in 1039/40. His nephew, Tahir ibn Ali ibn Moshkan, known by his title of Thiqat al-Mulk, served as the vizier of Sultan Mas'ud III (r. 1099-1115).

Sources 
 
 
 
 

1040 deaths
Year of birth unknown
11th-century Iranian people
Ghaznavid officials
People from Khorasan